The Library Association of Singapore (LAS) is a national-level, professional organization for Singapore's librarians and library workers.

History 
LAS was originally part of the Malayan Library Group created in March 1955, which was renamed in 1958 to become the Library Association of Malaya and Singapore. It became the Library Association of Singapore in 1960 as it was split from Persatuan Perpustakaan Persekutuan Tanah Melayu (Malaysia). Then it was reconstituted as the Persatuan Perpustakaan Malaysia, Chawagan Singapura (Library Association of Malaysia, Singapore Branch) in 1964, and finally Persatuan Perpustakaan Singapura in 1966. The name was changed from its Malay version to the English version used currently only in March 1975.

Publications 
LAS is responsible for publishing the Singapore Journal of Library and Information Management (SJLIM). Beginning in 1971, this scholarly journal is written in English and refereed. Another publication is the Singapore Libraries Bulletin for news and information purposes.

In 99 Words: Stories Librarians Tell is a book published by LAS in 2013 and launched during the 2013 IFLA conference held in Singapore.

International Involvement 
Together with International Federation of Library Associations and Institutions (IFLA) and National Library Board they organized the IFLA World Library and Information Congress in 2013. LAS was one of three partners to organize the Asia-Pacific Library and Information Conference (APLIC) held on July 29, 2018, in Canberra, Australia

References

External links
 Library Association of Singapore website
 Singapore Journal of Library and Information Management website
 Singapore Libraries Bulletin

Library associations
Organisations based in Singapore